Cancer 4 Cure is the third solo studio album by American rapper and producer El-P. It was released through Fat Possum Records on May 22, 2012. It peaked at No. 71 on the Billboard 200 chart.

Background
The album is dedicated to El-P's friend and fellow rapper Camu Tao, who died of lung cancer in May 2008 at the age of 30. In an interview with Rolling Stone, El-P said, "Camu was a huge inspiration on this record, mostly because he had a huge effect on my life and who I am." He elaborated, "I think that I'm trying to create an idea or illustrate a thought pattern, just because there's darkness that I see and think about, it doesn't mean I've given into it. I think the record is ultimately about not giving into it. For the most part I'm struggling with that darkness throughout the record. When I say it's about wanting to live, I just say that because that's how I feel. When you get hit with death, sometimes as horrible as it is, one of the things that can come out of it is a reaffirmation of how much you don't want to go, and I think that's what happened with me."

Critical reception

At Metacritic, which assigns a rating out of 100 to reviews from mainstream critics, the album has received a score of 84 based on 39 reviews, indicating "universal acclaim".

David Jeffries of AllMusic stated, "Cancer 4 Cure is about hip-hop like Glengarry Glen Ross was about sales, but these great works transcend their industries, offering solace and inspiration to anyone who would prefer a satisfied mind over a Cadillac Eldorado, or in current terms, an Escalade."

In a more critical review, Dan Weiss of The Boston Phoenix stated that the album "is definitely not El-P's Age of Apocalypse" and that "in fact it's the only El-P production that sounds like it's been made on planet Earth, following hip-hop rules that someone else already defined".

Accolades

Track listing
All tracks are written and produced by El-P, except where noted.

Personnel
Credits adapted from liner notes.

 El-P – vocals, design
 Little Shalimar – guitar (1, 2, 10, 12), vocoder (6), guitar effect (7), synthesizer (12), recording (all tracks)
 Wilder Zoby – synthesizer (1), keyboards (3, 5, 7, 12)
 Isaiah "Ikey" Owens – organ (1, 6), keyboards (5, 7, 9)
 James McNew – bass guitar (1, 6, 10)
 Camu Tao – vocals (2)
 Paul Banks – vocals (3)
 Jaleel Bunton – guitar (3)
 Mr. Muthafuckin' eXquire – vocals (5)
 Danny Brown – vocals (5)
 Dave "Smoota" Smith – horns (11)
 Killer Mike – vocals (6)
 Despot – vocals (6)
 Matt Sweeney – guitar (6, 12)
 Himanshu Suri – vocals (7)
 Nick Diamonds – vocals (11)
 Biondo – vocals (12)
 Joey Raia – mixing
 Glenn Schick – mastering
 Ron Croudy – design
 Timothy Saccenti – photography

Charts

References

External links
 
 

2012 albums
El-P albums
Albums produced by El-P
Fat Possum Records albums